The IPSC Czech Handgun Championship is an IPSC level 3 championship held once a year by the Practical Shooting Association of the Czech Republic.

Champions 
The following is a list of current and previous champions.

Overall category

Senior category

See also 
IPSC Czech Handgun Championship

References 

Czech Rifle Championship 2006 - Results
Match Results - 2006 Czech Rifle Championship
Match Results - 2017 IPSC Czech Rifle Championship
Match Results - 2018 Czech Rifle Championship

IPSC shooting competitions
Shooting competitions in the Czech Republic
National shooting championships